The Ohuri River is a river of the Northland Region of New Zealand. It flows north to reach the Waima River five kilometres southeast of Rawene.

See also
List of rivers of New Zealand

References

Rivers of the Northland Region
Rivers of New Zealand